Tale of the Tribe was a book to be written by Robert Anton Wilson. According to the publisher's announcement, it was to cover topics such as the Internet, James Joyce and linguistics. It never appeared before Wilson's death on January 11, 2007.

References

Consciousness studies
Discordianism
Novels by Robert Anton Wilson
Unpublished books
Lost books